South Korean girl group Oh My Girl has released five studio albums, one compilation album, eight extended plays, two repackage albums, one single album and fifteen singles. The group was formed by the Korean entertainment company WM Entertainment in 2015. The group's debut mini album, Oh My Girl, was released on April 20, 2015. On October 8, 2015, their second extended play titled Closer was released. The group's third mini album, Pink Ocean was released on March 28, 2016 along with its lead single "Liar Liar". After almost 2 months, they released a repackage album of Pink Ocean, titled Windy Day with two additional tracks and a Chinese version of "Liar Liar". On August 1, 2016 they released Listen to My Word, a special summer album containing four remake songs, including Papaya's "Listen to My Word (A-ing)" featuring Skull and Haha.

Albums

Studio albums

Compilation albums

Reissues

Single albums

Extended plays

Singles

Promotional singles

Other collaborations

Appearances on compilations

Soundtrack appearances

Other songs

Videography

Music videos

Footnotes

References

Discography
K-pop music group discographies
Discographies of South Korean artists